Sepia senta is a species of cuttlefish native to the southeastern Indian Ocean, specifically the North West Shelf in Western Australia ( to ). It is possibly also present in Indonesia. Reid et al. (2005) note that "a very similar, probably closely related animal has been found in the Philippines". S. senta lives at depths of 256 to 426 m.

Females are on average larger than males. They grow to 83 mm and 62 mm in mantle length, respectively.

The type specimen was collected off Western Australia and is deposited at the Museum of Victoria in Melbourne.

References

External links

Cuttlefish
Molluscs described in 1997
Molluscs of Australia
Taxa named by Amanda Reid (malacologist)